Wäija-Dynäs IK is a sports club in Väja, Sweden.

The women's soccer team played three seasons in the Swedish top division between 1979 and 1981.

References

External links
Wäija-Dynäs IK 

Football clubs in Västernorrland County